The 6 January Dictatorship was a royal dictatorship established in the Kingdom of Serbs, Croats and Slovenes (Kingdom of Yugoslavia after 1929) by King Alexander I (r. 1921–34) with the ultimate goal to create a Yugoslav ideology and a single Yugoslav nation. It lasted from 6 January 1929, when the king prorogued parliament and assumed control of the state, and ended with the 1931 Yugoslav Constitution.

History
In 1928, Croatian Peasant Party leader Stjepan Radić was assassinated in the Parliament of Yugoslavia by a Montenegrin Serb leader and People's Radical Party politician Puniša Račić, during a tense argument.

On 6 January 1929, using as a pretext the political crisis triggered by the shooting, King Alexander abolished the Vidovdan Constitution, prorogued the Parliament and assumed dictatorial powers. He appointed a cabinet solely responsible to him, and imposed tight censorship on the press. Initially, he claimed that this was only a temporary situation that would allow him to unify the country. with the aim of establishing the Yugoslav ideology and single Yugoslav nation. He changed the name of the country to "Kingdom of Yugoslavia", and changed the internal divisions from the 33 oblasts to nine new banovinas on 3 October. This decision was made following a proposal by the British ambassador to better decentralize the country, modeled on Czechoslovakia. A Court for the Protection of the State was soon established to act as the new regime's tool for putting down any dissent. Opposition politicians Vladko Maček and Svetozar Pribićević were arrested under charges by the court. Pribićević later went into exile, whereas over the course of the 1930s Maček would become the leader of the entire opposition bloc.

Immediately after the dictatorship was proclaimed, Croatian deputy Ante Pavelić left for exile from the country. The following years Pavelić worked to establish a revolutionary organization, the Ustaše, allied with the Internal Macedonian Revolutionary Organization (IMRO) against the state.

In 1931, Alexander decreed a new Constitution which vested the King with executive power. Elections were to be by universal male suffrage. The provision for a secret ballot was dropped, and pressure on public employees to vote for the governing party was to be a feature of all elections held under Alexander's constitution. Further, half the upper house was directly appointed by the King, and legislation could become law with the approval of one of the houses alone if also approved by the King.

That same year, Croatian historian and anti-Yugoslavist intellectual Milan Šufflay was assassinated in Zagreb. As a response, Albert Einstein and Heinrich Mann sent an appeal to the International League of Human Rights in Paris condemning the murder, accusing the Yugoslav government. The letter states of a "horrible brutality which is being practiced upon the Croatian People". The appeal was addressed to the Paris-based Ligue des droits de l'homme (Human Rights League). In their letter Einstein and Mann held the Yugoslav king Aleksandar explicitly responsible for these circumstances.

Croat opposition to the new régime was strong and, in late 1932, the Croatian Peasant Party issued the Zagreb Manifesto which sought an end to Serb hegemony and dictatorship. The government reacted by imprisoning many political opponents including the new Croatian Peasant Party leader Vladko Maček. Despite these measures, opposition to the dictatorship continued, with Croats calling for a solution to what was called the "Croatian question". In late 1934, the King planned to release Maček from prison, introduce democratic reforms, and attempt find common ground between Serbs and Croats.

However, on 9 October 1934, the king was assassinated in Marseille, France, by Bulgarian Veličko Kerin (also known by his revolutionary pseudonym Vlado Chernozemski), an activist of IMRO, in a conspiracy with Yugoslav exiles and radical members of banned political parties in cooperation with the Croatian extreme nationalist Ustaše organisation.

Notes

Sources

Further reading
Stojkov, Todor. Opozicija u vreme šestojanuarske diktature 1929-1935. Prosveta, 1969.
Gašparič, Jure. SLS pod kraljevo diktaturo: diktatura kralja Aleksandra in politika Slovenske ljudske stranke v letih 1929-1935. Modrijan, 2007.
Imamović, Mustafa. Pravni položaj verskih zajednica za vreme šestojanuarske diktature. 1991
Janjatović, Bosiljka. "O progonima hrvatskih političara u Zagrebu za vrijeme karađorđevićevske šestojanuarske diktature." Radovi Zavoda za hrvatsku povijest 26.1 (1993): 161-176.
Janjatović, Bosiljka, and Petar Strčić. "Nekoliko spisa organa vlasti o komunistima na otoku Krku za šestojanuarske diktature." Vjesnik historijskih arhiva u Rijeci i Pazinu 16.1971) (1971): 91-126.
Jerotijevic, Zoran. "Економски и политички узроци увођења Шестојануарског режима (Economic and Political Causes of the Introduction of the January Sixth Regime)." Ekonomika 60.2 (2014): 227-238.
Kaučič, Domen. Odnos Slovencev do kralja Aleksandra I. Karađorđevića: odziv na politične poteze kraljevega dvora v času šestojanuarske diktature: diplomsko delo. Diss. D. Kaučič, 2015.
Drakić, Gordana. "Arising of the Legal System in the Yugoslav State between the Two World Wars." Proceedings of Novi Sad Faculty of Law 42 (2008).

1929 establishments in Yugoslavia
Kingdom of Yugoslavia
January 1929 events
1929 in politics